Nic O'Brien (born 1 January 1980) is a former New Zealand hurdler.  He held the national record over the 400m hurdles from 2003 until 2014. O'Brien studied at Villanova University.

Personal bests

References

Living people
1980 births
New Zealand male hurdlers